Frank Sweet (born 7 March 1988) is an Australian actor and musician. The son of veteran actor Gary Sweet, he was born in Melbourne and is currently based in Melbourne.

Sweet made his film debut as Marcus in 2:37, which was released on 17 August 2006. Frank is a member of the band Skye Harbour, which won MTV Australia's 'Kickstart' competition for unsigned bands, and were flown to Sydney for the 2008 ARIA awards.

Producers of the Channel 7 hit Dancing with the Stars considered including a "father-son twist" between Frank and Gary in the Season Five lineup, but Frank was ultimately dropped before production. However, the network's publicity manager is quoted as saying that "he's definitely someone who is on the Seven radar."

According to the Adelaide Advertiser, "Rumour has it the star has scored a small speaking role as a mechanic on Channel 9 drama McLeod's Daughters." Frank also appeared in a guest role on Channel 7's crime show 'City Homicide' as Aaron Linton.

Sweet also played Billy Fischer in Channel 9's Fat Tony & Co. TV miniseries which focuses on Tony Mokbel and his part in the ten year underworld war.

References

External links 
 
 Official Skye Harbour website

1988 births
Living people
Australian male film actors
Male actors from Adelaide
Male actors from Melbourne
Musicians from Adelaide
Musicians from Melbourne